Dodleston Castle in Cheshire was founded in the Middle Ages as a ringwork castle before being developed into a motte-and-bailey. It was first mentioned in 1277, but may have existed in the 12th century when the manor of Dodleston was held by the Boydel family. The site has been protected as a scheduled monument since 1952. The earthworks were surveyed in 1964, 1986, and 1995 – the third survey was the most detailed and was carried out by University College Chester.

References

External links 

 Bibliography of sources relating to Dodleston Castle

Castles in Cheshire
History of Cheshire
Scheduled monuments in Cheshire